Mungat may be:
 the Noongar name of Acacia acuminata
 the pronunciation of Montgat, a town in Spain